The 1959 North Texas State Eagles football team represented the University of North Texas as a member of the Missouri Valley Conference (MVC) during the 1959 NCAA University Division football season. The Eagles, coached by Odus Mitchell, compiled a 9–2 record, and outscored their opponents 303 to 103. The Eagles were ranked for two weeks in the AP Poll. They shared the MVC title with Houston and finished the season with a 28–8 loss to New Mexico State in the 1959 Sun Bowl.

Schedule

References

North Texas State
North Texas Mean Green football seasons
Missouri Valley Conference football champion seasons
North Texas State Eagles football